The Virginia Department of Health oversees public health throughout the Commonwealth of Virginia in the United States. It has 35 local health districts.

See also
Virginia Board of Health

References

External links

State agencies of Virginia
State departments of health of the United States
Medical and health organizations based in Virginia